State Road 84 (SR 84) is a highway in the U.S. state of Florida originally extending from the Tamiami Trail (U.S. Route 41) in Naples to Federal Highway (U.S. Route 1) in Fort Lauderdale. The road now consists of two noncontiguous pieces––in Collier County as Davis Boulevard and in Broward County as Marina Mile Boulevard and highway frontage roads.

Route description

Collier County segment
A 7-mile-long section exists in Collier County, Florida, beginning at Tamiami Trail (US 41) in Naples. It travels east along Davis Boulevard, passing through the neighborhood of East Naples. This section has an eastern terminus at Collier Boulevard, signed to the north as State Road 951 and to the south as County Road 951, near Exit 101 of Interstate 75 (Alligator Alley) south of Golden Gate. East of SR / CR 951, the road is known as Beck Boulevard, an unsigned road.

From 1969 until the completion of Interstate 75 in 1993, SR 84 was a primary route through Alligator Alley across the Florida peninsula.

Broward County segment
A 12-mile-long stretch in Broward County, Florida that is now primarily a service road for Interstate 595 (SR 862), with the westbound lanes adjacent to the New River Canal. The easternmost three miles (5 km) comprise a divided four-lane highway traversing a Fort Lauderdale neighborhood mostly known as Marina Mile Boulevard (though the most eastern mile of SR 84 is also known as Southeast 24th Street). The present I-595 follows the original route of SR 84 west of the split between the two roads.

History

In the 1960s it was becoming apparent that the Tamiami Trail was becoming insufficient to handle the rapidly growing traffic between Tampa and southeastern Florida, and adding lanes to the road that was once considered a major engineering feat was not feasible in light of the demands of nearby Everglades National Park and the Miccosukee Tribe living near the Trail. It was finally decided that a second transpeninsular road would be best to serve the need of motorists to go from “coast to coast” south of Lake Okeechobee, the new one featuring a toll limited access two-lane freeway, the "Everglades Parkway" (the original name of the road that became better known as “Alligator Alley”).  On January 15, 1969, the highway was completed, and the State Road 84 designation and signs were placed along the entire length of the road from Naples to Fort Lauderdale.

Two decades later, the southern extension of Interstate 75 from Tampa was moving forward with earnest, as was the construction of Interstate 595.  Because the population and traffic of southern Broward County were growing at a fast rate, Interstate 595 was being built to improve the connections between the Alley and US 1 (and improve access to Port Everglades and Fort Lauderdale-Hollywood International Airport), and the eastbound lanes of SR 84 were shifted southward to accommodate the new expressway that runs down what once was a large grassy median with limited cross-overs/turnarounds for SR 84. I-595 was opened to traffic in the mid-1980s.

When four-laning of Alligator Alley was completed to Interstate highway and environmental standards (several tunnels were constructed at various points under the road for the critically endangered Florida Panther), signs along the toll road identifying it as SR 84 were removed, and I-75 signs went up to replace them in early 1993. While the SR 84 could have remained the hidden designation of the road, the Florida Department of Transportation decided to supersede it with the hidden designation already in place for I-75 south of Gillette: SR 93. This created the disconnection of SR 84 that exists to the present day.

Major intersections

References

External links

 Florida Route Log (SR 84)

084
Interstate 75
084
084